Haji Kusa is a village in northern Aleppo Governorate, northern Syria. Administratively part of Nahiya al-Rai in al-Bab District, the village has a population of 1,011 as per the 2004 census. On 12 November 2016, Haji Kusa was captured by the Syrian National Army from ISIS.

References

Populated places in al-Bab District